Vaitheeswarankoil is a panchayat town in Mayiladuthurai district in the Indian state of Tamil Nadu.

Demographics
 India census, Vaitheeswarankoil had a population of 7522. Males constitute 50% of the population and females 50%. Vaitheeswarankoil has an average literacy rate of 73%, higher than the national average of 59.5%: male literacy is 80%, and female literacy is 67%. In Vaitheeswarankoil, 11% of the population is under 6 years of age.

See also
 Vaitheeswaran Koil
 Thiruchendur Murugan Temple
 Nadi astrology
 Vibhuti

References

Cities and towns in Mayiladuthurai district